"I Can't Believe That You've Stopped Loving Me" is a song written by Dallas Frazier and A.L. "Doodle" Owens, and recorded by American country music artist Charley Pride.  It was released in September 1970 as the second single from the album From Me to You.  The song was Pride's fifth number one on the country charts.  The single stayed at number one for two weeks and spent a total of fifteen weeks on the country charts.

Chart performance

References

1970 singles
1970 songs
Charley Pride songs
Songs written by Dallas Frazier
Songs written by A.L. "Doodle" Owens
Song recordings produced by Jack Clement
RCA Records singles